Fra Tiburzio Baldini (early 17th century) was an Italian painter of the Baroque period.  He was born in  Bologna, and painted  for the churches and convents at Brescia, including a Marriage of the Virgin with St. Joseph and the Murder of the Innocents in the church of Santa Maria delle Grazie.

References

17th-century Italian painters
Italian male painters
Italian Baroque painters
Painters from Bologna
Painters from Brescia
Year of death unknown
Year of birth unknown